Aharonyan, also transliterated as Aharonian, is an Armenian surname. Notable people with the surname include:

Avetis Aharonyan (1866–1948), Armenian politician and writer
Ruben Aharonyan (born 1947), Armenian classical violinist

Aharonian
Coriún Aharonián (1940–2017), Uruguayan composer and musicologist
Felix A. Aharonian (born 1952), astrophysicist

Armenian-language surnames